The Northern and Pacific Junction Railway (N&PJ) is a historic railway located in northern Ontario, Canada. It connected the Northern Railway of Canada's endpoint in Gravenhurst to the Canadian Pacific Railway (CPR) at Nipissing Junction, near North Bay. The N&PJ provided an almost straight line north-south route from Toronto to the transcontinental line, competing with a similar line of the Canadian Northern Railway (CNoR) a short distance to the east.

The railway was incorporated in 1881 as the Northern, North-Western, and Sault Ste. Marie Railway Company, changing its name to N&PJ in 1883. The railway was acquired by the Northern Railway of Canada and the Hamilton and North-Western Railway in 1883.

Construction was commenced at Gravenhurst in 1885 and completed to a connection with the CPR in 1886, at which time the line was leased to its owners. Following the amalgamation of its owners with the Grand Trunk Railway in 1888, the N&PJ was merged with the GTR in 1892, which later became part of the Canadian National Railways.

Principal stations along this route, from Gravenhurst are:

Bracebridge
Utterson
Huntsville
Novar
Scotia Junction (connection to Ottawa, Arnprior and Parry Sound Railway)
Emsdale
Burk's Falls
Sundridge
South River
Trout Creek
Powassan
Lake Nosbonsing Road (formerly Nosbonsing and Nipissing Railway)
Callander
Nipissing Junction (original 1886 connection with CPR, to North Bay station).

See also

 List of Ontario railways
 List of defunct Canadian railways

References

Grand Trunk Railway subsidiaries
Defunct Ontario railways
Predecessors of the Grand Trunk Railway